Kümbet, is a village in Seyitgazi district of Eskişehir Province, Turkey.

History 
As a name of "Kümbet" comes from a building which contains a tomb like cupolas. This cupolas belongs to Seljuq dynasty and in district graveyard there are too many tombs also belongs to Seljuq dynasty. At the entrance and near the district there are too many historical buildings and many of them belongs to Phrygians.

Geography 
Kümbet is about 83 km (51,5 miles) from Eskişehir and 40 km (24,8 miles) from Seyitgazi. Kümbet is between Eskişehir and Afyonkarahisar cities and related Seyitgazi as a district.

Climate 
Kümbet according to its location, has continental climate. In winter, it is cold and rainy. In summer, its wet and warm. The hottest months in Kümbet are July and August and the coldest months in district are January and February. Rains are mostly few at summer, but distributed regular in other months. From time to time, in spring there are floods due to heavy rains. There is no landslides but rarely there are fierce winds. District's aborigines is steppe. In the district, you can see iç fruit, poplar and willow trees and the areas which surrounding the district have pine trees.

Population

Economy 
Kümbet district's economy based on farming, livestock and markets. Also some of residents deal shepherded and works for Kırka mine. There are two active grocery stores and two teahouses.

Governance 
Taking its own governance, Kümbet made elections. After Law No. 6360 (turning villages to districts which related big cities) Kümbet isn't a village and districts governance related with Seyitgazi.
 {| class="wikitable"
!Year
!Name of demarch
|-
|2009
|Seydi Kanat
|-
|2004
|Mevlut Tuncer
|-
|1999
|Seydi Bozok
|}

Substructure 
There is elementary school in district. Kümbet has its own drinking water supply but there is no controls of drinking water supply. There is no sewage system. The path which connects district to freeway is asphalt. District also has electrical connection and land phone-network connection.

References

External links 
 Yerelnet

Villages in Eskişehir Province
Seyitgazi District